Humpty Dumpty is a pinball machine released by Gottlieb on October 25, 1947. Named after Humpty Dumpty, the nursery rhyme character, it is the first pinball machine to include flippers — invented by Harry Mabs  — distinguishing it from earlier bagatelle game machines.

Description

Humpty Dumpty had six of these flippers, referred to as "flipper bumpers" by the company. However, unlike modern pinball tables, they faced outward instead of inward and were not placed at the bottom of the table near the main outhole.

Like all early pinball tables, Humpty Dumpty was constructed with wood and had backlit scoring in preset units of scoring rather than mechanical reel or electronic LED scoring.

Design team
 Concept: Harry Mabs
 Game Design: Harry Mabs
 Mechanics: Harry Mabs
 Artwork: Roy Parker
 Animation: Harry Mabs

Digital version
The table was virtually recreated in pinball simulation video game, Microsoft Pinball Arcade, although it was not included in the Game Boy Color version of that game.

References

External links

Gottlieb pinball machines
1947 pinball machines